Savola is a Finnish surname. Notable people with the surname include:

Albin Savola (1867–1934), Finnish Lutheran priest and missionary
Elmo Savola (born 1995), Finnish athlete
Mikko Savola, Finnish politician
Terttu Savola (born 1941), Finnish politician

Finnish-language surnames